The IPSC Finnish Shotgun Championship is an IPSC level 3 championship held once a year by the Finnish Shooting Sport Federation.

Champions 
The following is a list of current and previous champions.

Overall category

Senior category

See also 
IPSC Finnish Handgun Championship
IPSC Finnish Rifle Championship
IPSC Finnish Tournament Championship
IPSC Finnish Action Air Championship

References 

Match Results - 2009 IPSC Finnish Shotgun Championship
Match Results - 2010 IPSC Finnish Shotgun Championship
Match Results - 2011 IPSC Finnish Shotgun Championship
Match Results - 2012 IPSC Finnish Shotgun Championship
Match Results - 2013 IPSC Finnish Shotgun Championship

IPSC shooting competitions
National shooting championships
Finland sport-related lists
Shooting competitions in Finland